was a Japanese photographer.

Notes

References
  Nihon no shashinka (日本の写真家) / Biographic Dictionary of Japanese Photography. Tokyo: Nichigai Associates, 2005. . Despite the English-language alternative title, all in Japanese.
 Nihon shashinka jiten (日本写真家事典) / 328 Outstanding Japanese Photographers. Kyoto: Tankōsha, 2000. . Despite the English-language alternative title, all in Japanese.

Japanese photographers
1913 births
2005 deaths